Madison–Stewart Historic District is a historic district in Cincinnati, Ohio. It was listed on the National Register of Historic Places in 1975 and contains twelve contributing buildings.

Notes

External links
Documentation from the University of Cincinnati

Historic districts in Cincinnati
Queen Anne architecture in Ohio
Federal architecture in Ohio
Italianate architecture in Ohio
National Register of Historic Places in Hamilton County, Ohio
Historic districts on the National Register of Historic Places in Ohio